Oxyurichthys limophilus is a species of goby found in the western Indian Ocean off Kenya.

References

limophilus
Fish of Africa
Taxa named by Frank Lorenzo Pezold III
Taxa named by Helen K. Larson
Fish described in 2015